The Col de Chermotane (also known as Col de Charmotane) is an Alpine pass located in the Swiss canton of Valais. With an elevation of 3,037 metres above sea level, the Col de Chermotane is the lowest pass between the valleys of Bagnes and Hérens. The pass lies a few kilometres north of the main chain of the Alps and is covered by the Otemma Glacier. It connects Chanrion to Arolla, both in the upper part of their valley.

The pass is located between the Pigne d'Arolla (north) and the Petit Mont Collon (south).

References

External links
 Col de Chermotane on Hikr

Mountain passes of Switzerland
Mountain passes of the Alps